Fratricide is the act of killing one's brother.

Fratricide may also refer to:

 Fratricide (film), a 1922 German silent drama
 "A Fratricide", a short story by Franz Kafka
 Friendly fire, an unintentional military attack on forces of the same side
 Nuclear fratricide, the inadvertent destruction of nuclear weapon systems by other warheads in the same attack
 EW fratricide, electronic warfare operations that interfere with friendly military capabilities

See also
 Brothers War (disambiguation)
 List of fratricides in fiction
 Sororicide, the act of killing one's sister